Si Racha Municipal Stadium is a multi-purpose stadium in Si Racha, Chonburi, Thailand. It is currently used mostly for football matches.  The stadium holds 5,000 people.

References

Multi-purpose stadiums in Thailand
Buildings and structures in Chonburi province
Sport in Chonburi province